Sinhala numerals, are the units of the numeral system, originating from the Indian subcontinent, used in Sinhala language in modern-day Sri Lanka.

Numerals or numerations around Kandyan Kingdom 
It had been found that five different types of numerations were used in the Sinhala language at the time of the invasion of the Kandyan kingdom by the British. Out of the five types of numerations, two sets of numerations were in use in the twentieth century mainly for astrological calculations and to express traditional year and dates in ephemerides. The five types or sets of numerals or numerations are listed below.

Sinhala archaic numerals or Sinhala Illakkam
Abraham Mendis Gunasekera, in A Comprehensive Grammar of Sinhalese Language (1891), described a set of archaic numerals which were no longer in use. According to Mr. Gunesekera, these numerals were used for ordinary calculations and to express simple numbers. Gunasekera wrote:
The Sinhalase had symbols of its own to represent the different numerals which were in use until the beginning of the present century. Arabic Figures are now universally used. For the benefit of the student, the old numerals are given in the plate opposite (No. iii.).

Sinhala numerals did not have a zero and they also did not have zero concept holder. They included separate symbols for 10, 40, 50, 100, 1000.

These numerals were also regarded as Lith Lakunu or ephemeris numbers by W. A. De Silva in his Catalogue of Palm leaf manuscripts in the library of Colombo Museum. This set of numerals was known as Sinhala illakkam or Sinhala archaic numerals.

Sinhala numerals or Sinhala illakkam were used in the Kandyan convention which was signed between Kandyan Chieftains and the British governor, Robert Brownrig, in 1815. Eleven clauses were numbered in Arabic numerals in the English part of the agreement, and the parallel Sinhala clauses were numbered in Sinhala archaic numerals.

Sinhala astrological numerals or Sinhala Lith Illakkam

Although this numeral set was commonly used for casting horoscopes and to carry out astrological calculations, it had been found that this set had been used for numbering pages of Ola palm leaf books which covered primarily of non-Buddhist topics in Sinhala. Numbers of lith illakkam look Sinhala letters and vowel modifiers, and it had been discovered that there are mainly two versions of these illakkam according to the way numbers 2, 3 and 9 are written. The number six is known as ‘akma’ in the Lith Illakkam. These numerals were in use continuously for writing horoscopes on Ola leaf, the tradition of which continued till the beginning of the twentieth century. Both versions of Lith illakkam have a zero and the zero is the Halantha or Hal lakuna (kodiya) in the Sinhala language. Although it is not understood whether Sinhala mathematicians treated zero as a number, it was quite possible they had known the concept of zero. In Lith Illakkam, numbers greater than zero were written the same way as the Arabic numbers with the zero and the value of the number in the left was increased by ten. In other words, Lith illakkam had a zero and a zero place holder concept. Lith illakkum version 1 had for 2, 3 and 9, Sinhala letter ‘Murthda Na’ in 6 to 8th century. In the second version of Lith Illakkam as W. A. De Silva had depicted in his book, 2,3 and 9, Sinhala letter, ‘Na’ (න) with vowel modifiers.

One of the most interesting articles which had been discovered is an article on numerals and numerations in Sinhala language, the authorship of which has been attributed to Abrham Mendis Gunesekera. In this article, he refers to Lith Illakam as well as to Sinhala Illakkam. For Sinhala illakkam, he produces the same shapes which had been given in his English book. Abraham Mendis Gunesekera uses modern Sinhala letters and vowel modifiers which is the Version 2 of Lith illakkam. In this article, he clearly mentions that Hal lakuna or ‘Kodiya’ is the zero. In other words, ‘Sunayathana’ is filled with a kodiya will multiply by ten of the number which is on the left side of Sunayasthana. Abrham Mendis Gunesekera clearly states that instead of Hal lakuna of the Sinhala language, a ‘Shunaya binduawa’ (zero) can be used to fill the ‘Shunayasthana’ (Zero Place Holder). In other words, Lith Illakkum uses duality of zero to write numbers greater than 9.

Katapayadiya
Even to this day, years are given in the front page of popular ephemeris in Sri Lanka, ‘Panchanga Lith’ using ‘Katapayadiya’. Katapayadiya is a unique numbering scheme where numbers 1 to 9 and 0 have been depicted by Sinhala consonants. The katapayadiya is mainly used for writing dates. This is numeration is known as Katapayadiya since number one is allocated with the Sinhala letters ‘Ka’ (ක), ‘Ta’ (ට), ‘Pa’ (ප ) and ‘Ya’ (ය) . In this tradition of writing numbers, the year 2007 can be written with for instance ‘Ka’ (ඛ) ‘Na’ (න) ‘Na’ (න) ‘Sa’ (ස). Traditionally, 2007 will be written from right to left: 7002. Ordinarily, using vowel modifiers, a word in Sanskrit will be created for the year 2007 (7002 right to left) with the allocated letters for 7002. When reading, one has to remove the vowel modifier. Katapayadiya was widely used by South Indian astrologers and some of Chola rock inscriptions in Sri Lanka have dates inscribed in Katapyadia.

Page numbering of Ola leaves using Sinhala ‘Swara’

The method of page numbering of Ola using Sinhala Swara with consonants had been common tradition in the ancient and recent history of Sri Lanka. The author had found that using Sinhala Swara in place of numeration could be traced back to Aryabhata's (the great Indian Mathematician and Astronomer) numbering system where he used Sanskrit Swaras in place of numerals. Sinhala scribes had developed its own numeration based upon Sinhala characters according to the order of the position of consonants and vowels in the Sinhala Alphabet without the modern two vowels: ‘Ae’ (ඇ) and ‘Ae:’ (ඈ) in the Sinhala Alphabet (the Sinhala alphabet without the above-mentioned two vowels is known as ‘Pansal Hodiya’ or the alphabet of the temple). The numeration method which is similar to the use of Sinhala Swara is found in Burmese Ola collection.

The tradition of Swara as numeration in page numbering in Ola had been commonly used for Buddhist manuscripts. The authors had the opportunity of examining several Ola palm leaf books which are in the Colombo Museum and the catalogues of Hugh Neville collection in the London Museum. Having investigated paging of Ola leaves, the majority of palm leaf manuscripts which are in the museum had Sinhala consonants with ‘swara’ (ස්වර) (combinations of sounds) for numbering. The number of combinations which can be made out of consonants is 544 and once the first 544 finishes, paging begins with the second cycle of 544 with the word ‘dwi:’ (ද්වී) or second in English. If the second cycle does not end the palm leaf book, it goes into third cycle of 544 which begins with the word ‘three’ (ත්රීp) or Three in English.

Bhootha Anka or Butha Samkaya 
In Sinhala literature, certain words in the language were used to denote numbers. For instance, sky is associated with zero or ‘Sunaya’, and a number which was denoted by words is known as Bhuta Anka. Bhootha Anka was created by ancient Sanskrit mathematicians and astronomers prior to the invention of a symbol for zero. Some of the words which are associated with numbers are
Moon = one
Eye = two
Fire = three
To write 130, one would place moon, fire, sky together to form the number.

Pierre-Sylvain Filliozat, in his article ‘Ancient Sanskrit Mathematics: An oral tradition and a written literature”, describes Bhootha Anka as object-number metronomic expressions.

As it was mentioned previously, knowledge was transferred through memory rather than writing it down. In order to make memorization easier, it is natural that the numbers are placed as words and the words are formulated sequentially that they would sound rhythmical. The Indian tradition of Bhootha anka was imported to Sri Lanka as it was used in India and the tradition continued with Sinahala words that had same meanings.

Brahmi numerals found in Sri Lanka

Dr. Paranavithana (first Sri Lankan Commissioner of Archaeology) and Dr. Abaya Aryiasinha had independently found in their research that the Sinhalese had used numerals which closely resembled Brahmi numerals of India in the early days of Sinhala civilization. The evidence for use of Brahmi numerals had been discovered primarily in rock inscriptions which were inscribed in between AD 200 and 400. These numerals were used to record donations given by royals and other people who were belonged to the upper echelon of ancient Sinhala society to Buddhist temples.
Brahmi numerals are ancestors of Arabic numerals which are used presently worldwide. Brahmi numerals had symbols for 10,100, and 1000. Number 1 and 10 in Brahmi have not been found in Sri Lanka up to now. Therefore, shapes of these two numerals have been hypothesized taking into consideration of shapes of Brahmi Number 1 and 10 found in India without physical evidence .
Sinhala rock inscriptions suddenly become barren of numerals from A.D. 400 onwards. Tradition of writing numbers in word becomes more prevalent from the above period.

Research into Sinhala numerals
Although a few scholars had recorded the existence of Sinhala numerals after 1815, a comprehensive research was required to establish the past existence and precise shapes of these numerals.

The proposal, L2/07-002R (ISO/IEC JTC1/SC2/WG2 N3195R), which was submitted by Mr. Michael Everson to the Unicode consortium for encoding a set of numerals which he claimed were Sinhala numerals, initiated research into Sinhala numerals and numerations. 
 Through the research which was carried out by Mr. Harsha Wijayawardhana of University of Colombo School of Computing (UCSC) under the aegis of the Information and Communication Technology Agency (ICTA) of Sri Lanka, it was discovered that other than the set of numerals submitted by Mr. Michael Everson for encoding, there were four other sets which were commonly used by Sinhala scribes, namely Sinhala Lith Illakkam (Astrological Digits) mainly used for writing horoscopes; Swara, (Sinhala Consonant and vowel modifier based numerals); Katapayadiya, a special Sinhala character based numeral set which was used for inscribing years in astrological writing, in ancient Ola and in rock inscriptions; and word based Bootha Anka or Samkaya used in Sinhala Poetry. Mr. Wijayawardhana identified the numeral set which was submitted by Mr. Michael Everson to UCS as Sinhala Illakkam (Sinhala Archaic Numerals).

Subsequently, Prof. K.D. Paranvithana of Raja Rata University, Sri Lanka, and Mr. Harsha Wijayawardhana carried out further research and the findings were presented at the National Archaeological Symposium held in July 2009, in Colombo, Sri Lanka, organized by the Department of Archaeology. The Synopsis of the paper was published in the Volume II of the Symposium's proceedings. In October 2009, Mr. Harsha Wijayawardhana authored a book titled “Numerations in the Sinhala Language”.

The research into Sinhala numerals were carried out from both the linguistic and mathematical perspectives. In their research, the researchers had looked specifically for the existence of zero in any form of numerations in the Sinhala language, since the invention of zero had been a major demarcation point in mathematics and advancement in modern pure mathematics would have not been possible without having the concept of zero. Although zero had been discovered and re-discovered independently by various civilizations in the world, it is now accepted that zero as an independent number was discovered and used for the first time by the Indian mathematicians and it had been taken to the west by the Arabs with the rest of numerals which were developed in India from Brahmi numerals. E.T. Bell in his book, the development of Mathematics, describes of the development of zero by Indian mathematicians in the following manner:
“The problem of numeration was finally solved by Hindus at some controversial date before A.D. 800. The introduction of zero as a symbol denoting the absence of units or of certain powers of ten in a number represented by the Hindu numerals has been rated as one of the greatest practical inventions of all time”.

In their research into Sinhala numerals or numerations, the authors had looked into the following:
 Papers or publications on Sinhala numerals
 Original documents which had some of form of numerals or numerations
 Rock inscriptions
 Ola leaf page numbering
 Any evidence for zero in Sinhala numerals or numerations
 Numismatics
Shapes of several numeral sets which belong to Indic languages were compared with of the numerals sets which were identified as numerals or numerations in the Sinhala language. The Indic numerals sets which were studied extensively were Thai, Lao, Burmese, and Malayalam numerals.
Colombo and Kandy museum were visited many instances to study Ola leaf pagination by the researchers. Colombo museum library hosts to an Ola leaf collection which is known as W. A. De Silva Collection and this sizable collection amounts to be 5000. Some of the original and older Ola leaf collections were found to be outside of Sri Lanka. A major collection is located in Britain and is known as Hue Neville collection and the catalogue of this collection is available in Sri Lanka. Other country museums that are reputed to host to Sinhala Ola leaf collections are in Arizona, US, Brussels, Belgium and Netherlands.

Numerals

See also
Sinhala Archaic Numbers

References

Bibliography

External links 
 https://archive.today/20130218235016/http://www.ilink.lk/si/programmes/709-icta-promotes-quality-software.html
 https://archive.today/20130218223247/http://www.icta.lk/en/policy-leadership-and-institutional-development/709-sinhala-numerals-were-used-in-the-kandyan-convention-says-icta-book.html

Numerals
Sinhala script